Athletic Park was a sports facility in Vancouver, British Columbia, Canada mainly used for baseball but also hosted soccer, football, lacrosse, bike races, and rallies.

Opening day

Bob Brown, the man who would later be known as Vancouver's "Mr. Baseball" cleared the stadium site himself, and was responsible for the building of the structure made entirely out of wood.

Athletic Park replaced Recreation Park. It was on a narrow block bounded by Hemlock Street (west, first base); 6th Avenue (south, a very short right field); Birch Street (east, left field); railroad tracks (northeast); and 5th Avenue imaginary line (north, third base). Newspaper advertisements typically gave the location as "5th and Hemlock".

The park opened April 17, 1913, with a baseball game featuring the Vancouver Beavers who defeated the Tacoma Tigers 8–4 before a then-record 5,663 spectators. The opening of the facility was launched with an hour-long civic parade, which according to the Vancouver Province, "...commenced at the post office promptly at 2 o'clock and wended its way along Cordova to Main, along Main to Hastings and west along Hastings to Granville and then proceeded up Granville to Fifth Avenue and the ball park." 

The first admission prices were 25 and 50 cents.

Significant events
After staging an "all-star" game on Christmas Day 1923, in January and February 1924 the first organized league of "Canadian Rugby Football" in the province of British Columbia was played out of Athletic Park featuring UBC, Knights of Columbus, Y.M.C.A and King George Grads. The odd dates on the calendar for the grid game were due to soccer, rugby and baseball limiting access to the new game. The founding of the four team league is regarded by both the UBC Thunderbirds and Football BC as the start of organized football for both operations.

The first baseball game played under the lights in Canada was won by the Vancouver Firemen 5-3 over Vancouver Arrows, July 3, 1931. In second part of the double header, Vancouver Athletic Club beat B.C. Telephone 1-0. Both games were five innings.

Babe Ruth played at Athletic Park on October 19, 1934, along with his team of "American League All-Stars" that included Lou Gehrig, Lefty Gomez, Charlie Gehringer, Heinie Manush, Lefty O'Doul, and manager Connie Mack.

Fire and rebuilding
There were two fires at Athletic Park followed by two rapid rebuilds. The first was in 1926. The second on February 28, 1945, caused $50,000 worth of damage. By then, Emil Sick owned the ball club and the park, which he had renamed Sick's Capilano Stadium in 1944.

The park was demolished in 1951 to allow the Hemlock viaduct to be built.  The soil from the park was taken to the newly built Capilano Stadium (II), later renamed Nat Bailey Stadium.

References

Canadian football venues in British Columbia
Sports venues in Vancouver
UBC Thunderbirds
Sports venues completed in 1913
Defunct Canadian football venues
Defunct baseball venues in Canada
Demolished buildings and structures in British Columbia
Defunct sports venues in Canada
Buildings and structures in Vancouver
History of Vancouver
1913 establishments in British Columbia
Lacrosse venues
University sports venues in Canada
Baseball venues in British Columbia